Lego Masters is a French reality television show based on the international franchise of the same name that debuted on M6 on 23 December 2020. It is hosted by magician Éric Antoine and is judged by Georg Schmitt and Paulina Aubey.

Format
Eight teams of two complete two challenges every week, with the judges deciding who gets eliminated. Lego Masters is presented by Éric Antoine, known for being a judge on La France a un incroyable talent. The show's two judges are Paulina Aubey, a visual artist, and Georg Schmitt, France's only Lego Certified Professional. The team that wins the competition gets €20,000 and the work that they made in the final will go on display at the Necker–Enfants Malades Hospital in Paris. The show has been likened to other reality tv shows such as Top Chef and Koh-Lanta.

Production
The series is produced by Endemol Shine France, a subsidiary of the Endemol Shine Group. The show was shot in July 2020 in a studio in Le Pré-Saint-Gervais. No less than 2.5 million bricks were used in the show which were purchased by Endemol Shine and were not provided free of charge. Antoine said in an interview that he had "called everyone at M6 to tell them that I was the man for the job" and that he was a "big fan of construction games". The show was first announced on 1 December 2020 and aired on M6 from 23 December 2020 to 12 January 2021. The series was also shown in Belgium on RTL-TVI from 26 December 2020 to January 16, 2021.

In the second episode the world record for the greatest weight supported by a brick bridge was surpassed by Alban and Xavier and Marguerite and Renaud. Both teams' bridges managed to hold 500 kg, beating the record of 453 kg previously set in the American version of the show. The winners of the first series were David and Sébastien who in the final created a Lego totem pole that represented them. Sébastien is a graphic designer and creator of the magazine Brique Mag who met David when he interviewed him about his Lego prosthetic arm. A second series was confirmed in March 2021.

Series details

Series 1

Lego Masters: Extra Brique
Extra episodes were released for every episode in the series. The episodes included unseen footage, behind the scenes and interviews.

Series 2

Reception
Lego Masters received positive reviews with over 4 million people watching the first episode. James Townley, Global Head of Creative Networks at Endemol Shine Group said "feel-good formats with plenty of optimism that attract a wide family audience are ideal for broadcasters around the world right now and it's brilliant to see a French version commissioned by M6,"
though some criticised the judges and the fact that fan favourites Guillaume & Loïc did not win the first series.

Viewership

Series 1

References

2020 French television series debuts
French game shows
French reality television series
French-language television programming in Belgium
French-language television shows
French television series based on British television series
Lego television series
M6 (TV channel) original programming
Television series by Endemol